The Kent Shield is an annual rugby union knock-out club competition organized by the Kent Rugby Football Union.  It was first introduced during the 2015-16 season, with the inaugural winners being Aylesford Bulls.  It is the second most important rugby union cup competition in Kent, behind the Kent Cup but ahead of the Kent Vase, Kent Plate and Kent Salver.

The Kent Shield is currently open to the first teams of club sides based in Kent that play in tier 7 (London 2 South East) and tier 8 (London 3 South East) of the English rugby union league system.  The format is a knockout cup with a first round, semi-finals and a final, typically to be held at a pre-determined ground at the end of April on the same date and venue as the Cup, Vase, Plate and Salver finals.  Teams that are knocked out of the first round join the teams knocked out of the first round of the Kent Cup to compete for the Kent Plate.

Kent Shield winners

Number of wins
Aylesford Bulls (1)
Dover (1)
Gravesend (1)
Medway (1)

See also
 Kent RFU
 Kent Cup
 Kent Vase
 Kent Plate
 Kent Salver
 English rugby union system
 Rugby union in England

References

External links
 Kent RFU

Recurring sporting events established in 2015
2015 establishments in England
Rugby union cup competitions in England
Rugby union in Kent